Stella Atkins is a professor emeritus in computing science at Simon Fraser University, and one of the founding members of the Systers community for technical women in computing. Her primary research interests are in medical computing and medical image display and analysis.

Education 
Atkins received a B.Sc. in chemistry from Nottingham University (1966). She went on to work at the Shell Refining Company as a chemical engineer, where she performed simulations of oil refineries and oil flow, and developed her interest in computing. Atkins later became a scientific computer programmer advisor at the University of Warwick and received a M.Phil. in computer science from there in 1976. In 1985, Atkins received a Ph.D. in computer science from the University of British Columbia.

References

External links
Google scholar profile

Living people
Canadian women computer scientists
Canadian computer scientists
Year of birth missing (living people)
Alumni of the University of Warwick
University of British Columbia Faculty of Science alumni
Academic staff of Simon Fraser University
Alumni of the University of Nottingham
British emigrants to Canada